Fifteen-ball (or fifteenball, 15 ball, 15-ball and other variant spellings) may refer to:

15 ball, the pool (pocket billiards) ball numbered "15", and traditionally colored with a brown or maroon stripe, but a tan stripe in some ball sets
Fifteen-ball pool, a pocket billiards game covered in the Billiard Congress of America rulebook
Rotation (pool), sometimes called fifteen-ball, a pocket billiards game (different from the above), played with fifteen object balls that are shot at in numerical order, and of which the 15 ball  is the game-winning ball
 15-ball, a fifteen-dimensional -ball in mathematics